Graney is a surname. Notable people with the surname include:

Dave Graney (born 1959), Australian rock musician, singer-songwriter, and author
Jack Graney (1886–1978), Canadian baseball player
Pat Graney, American activist and choreographer

See also
Raney